
Chipkill is IBM's trademark for a form of advanced error checking and correcting (ECC) computer memory technology that protects computer memory systems from any single memory chip failure as well as  multi-bit errors from any portion of a single memory chip. One simple scheme to perform this function scatters the bits of a Hamming code ECC word across multiple memory chips, such that the failure of any single memory chip will affect only one ECC bit per word. This allows memory contents to be reconstructed despite the complete failure of one chip. Typical implementations use more advanced codes, such as a BCH code, that can correct multiple bits with less overhead.

Chipkill is frequently combined with dynamic bit-steering, so that if a chip fails (or has exceeded a threshold of bit errors), another, spare, memory chip is used to replace the failed chip.  The concept is similar to that of RAID, which protects against disk failure, except that now the concept is applied to individual memory chips. The technology was developed by the IBM Corporation in the early and middle 1990s. An important RAS feature, Chipkill technology is deployed primarily on SSDs, mainframes and midrange servers.

An equivalent system from Sun Microsystems is called Extended ECC, while equivalent systems from HP are called Advanced ECC and Chipspare.  A similar system from Intel, called Lockstep memory, provides double-device data correction (DDDC) functionality.  Similar systems from Micron, called redundant array of independent NAND (RAIN), and from SandForce, called RAISE level 2, protect data stored on SSDs from any single NAND flash chip going bad.

A 2009 paper using data from Google's datacentres provided evidence demonstrating that in observed Google systems, DRAM errors were recurrent at the same location, and that 8% of DIMMs were affected each year. Specifically, "In more than 85% of the cases a correctable error is followed by at least one more correctable error in the same month".  DIMMs with chipkill error correction showed a lower fraction of DIMMs reporting uncorrectable errors compared to DIMMs with error correcting codes that can only correct single-bit errors.  A 2010 paper from University of Rochester also showed that Chipkill memory gave substantially lower memory errors, using both real world memory traces and simulations.

See also 

 ECC memory
 Lockstep (computing)
 Memory ProteXion
 Redundant array of independent memory
 Single-error correction and double-error detection (SECDED)

References

External links 
 Intel E7500 Chipset MCH Intelx4 Single Device Data Correction (x4 SDDC) Implementation and Validation, Intel Application note AP-726, August 2002.
 DRAM study turns assumptions about errors upside down, Ars Technica, October 7, 2009
 Enabling Memory Reliability, Availability, and Serviceability Features on Dell PowerEdge Servers, 2005
 Chipkill correct memory architecture, August 2000, by David Locklear
 The Mathematics of Chipkill ECC, October 2015, by Bob Day

Computer memory
Error detection and correction
IBM computer hardware